Anna Ebiere Banner (born 18 February 1995) is a Nigerian pageant winner and actress. She was crowned the Most Beautiful Girl in Nigeria) by 2012 MBGN Queen Isabella Ayuk in 2013 and represented Nigeria at the 2013 Miss World pageant. She was appointed as the Special Assistant on Culture and Tourism to Governor Henry Dickson upon her reign as Most Beautiful Girl in Nigeria (MBGN) in 2012. In 2014, she made her acting debut in Super Story.

Personal life
In 2014, she started a relationship with the famous Nigerian singer and songwriter Chinedu Okoli, popularly known as Flavour. Banner, aged 20, became pregnant with Flavour's child, giving birth to a girl, Sofia Okoli, on August 1, 2015 

By 2016, Banner had cut ties with Flavour, alleging that the singer was cheating with former girlfriend and baby mama, Sandra Okagbue. Sandra is also a former beauty queen.

While Banner and Flavour currently maintain a cordial co-parenting relationship, she has since come out to recount her many experiences raising her daughter. She had dropped out of Middlesex University, UAE as she couldn't cope with studying and being a mother at nineteen. She also noted that her parents were disappointed in her for getting pregnant out of wedlock. On February 1, 2021, she posted on her Instagram page how she struggled for years and almost took her own life. She is now dating Abdullahi Ahmed Osikhena Sa’ad.

References

1995 births
21st-century Nigerian actresses
People from Bayelsa State
Living people
Miss World 2013 delegates
Most Beautiful Girl in Nigeria winners
Nigerian female models
Nigerian film actresses
Nigerian beauty pageant contestants
Nigerian television actresses
Most Beautiful Girl in Nigeria contestants
Nigerian Internet celebrities